Tabor Spur is a narrow, jagged spur jutting out from the front of the Bermel Escarpment between Taylor Outlier and Elliott Nunatak, in the Thiel Mountains. The name was proposed by Peter Bermel and Arthur Ford, co-leaders of the United States Geological Survey (USGS) Thiel Mountains party which surveyed these mountains in 1960–61. Named for Rowland Tabor, USGS geologist with the 1961-62 Thiel Mountains party.

Ridges of Ellsworth Land